is a Japanese footballer who plays as a goalkeeper for  club Nagoya Grampus.

Playing career
Daichi Sugimoto joined J2 League club Kyoto Sanga FC in 2012. In 2016, he moved to Tokushima Vortis before joining J1 League side Yokohama F. Marinos in 2017.

Club statistics
Updated to 3 November 2022.

International 

 Japan national under-18 football team
 2012 AFC U-19 Championship qualification
 Japan national under-19 football team
 2013 AFC U-22 Championship qualification
 2012 AFC U-19 Championship
 Japan national under-20 football team
 Football at the 2013 East Asian Games
 Japan national under-21 football team
 2013 AFC U-22 Championship
 Japan national under-23 football team
 2016 AFC U-23 Championship
 Football at the 2016 Summer Olympics (Backup member)

References

External links

Profile at Tokushima Vortis
Profile at Vegalta Sendai

1993 births
Living people
Association football people from Kanagawa Prefecture
Japanese footballers
J1 League players
J2 League players
J3 League players
Kyoto Sanga FC players
Tokushima Vortis players
Yokohama F. Marinos players
Júbilo Iwata players
J.League U-22 Selection players
Vegalta Sendai players
Nagoya Grampus players
Association football goalkeepers